Georgianna Millington Bishop (October 15, 1878 – September 1, 1971) was an American amateur golfer. She was the winner of the 1904 U.S. Women's Amateur, played at Merion Golf Club in Ardmore, Pennsylvania. She played for the Brooklawn Golf Club in Bridgeport, Connecticut. In 1959, Bishop became the fifth inductee into the Connecticut Golf Hall of Fame after winning the state amateur championships for women four times: 1920–1922 and 1927.

Biography

She was born on October 15, 1878, in Bridgeport, Connecticut, to Sydney Bishop and Mary Helen Staples. In 1904 she won the U.S. Women's Amateur by defeating Mrs. E. F. Sanford from the Essex County Country Club at the Merion Cricket Club in Haverford, Pennsylvania.

She died on September 1, 1971, in Bridgeport, Connecticut.

References

American female golfers
Winners of ladies' major amateur golf championships
Golfers from Connecticut
Sportspeople from Bridgeport, Connecticut
1878 births
1971 deaths